Barbara Visser (born 16 August 1977) is a Dutch-Croatian politician of the People's Party for Freedom and Democracy (VVD). From 31 August 2021 to 10 January 2022, she served as Minister of Infrastructure and Water Management of the Netherlands in the third Rutte cabinet. She previously served as State Secretary for Defence from 26 October 2017 to 31 August 2021.

Career 
Visser began her political career in 2006 as a member of the municipal council of Zaanstad. In 2010, she vacated her seat to become an alderman. Her portfolio included economic affairs, tourism, employment and social integration.

She was elected into the Dutch House of Representatives in the 2012 general election. Visser left the House of Representatives on 26 October 2017, when she was appointed State Secretary for Defence in the third Rutte cabinet.

Personal life 
Visser was born in Šibenik in the Socialist Federal Republic of Yugoslavia (present-day Croatia) into a mixed Croatian-Dutch family. She currently lives in Zaandam, North Holland.

References

External links
 
 Drs. B. (Barbara) Visser on Parlement.com 

1977 births
Living people
Aldermen in North Holland
Croatian emigrants to the Netherlands
Dutch management consultants
Dutch people of Croatian descent
Members of the House of Representatives (Netherlands)
Ministers of Infrastructure of the Netherlands
Ministers of Water Management of the Netherlands
Municipal councillors in North Holland
People from Šibenik
People from Zaanstad
People's Party for Freedom and Democracy politicians
State Secretaries for Defence of the Netherlands
Women government ministers of the Netherlands
21st-century Dutch civil servants
21st-century Dutch politicians
21st-century Dutch women politicians